The Real Housewives of New York City is an American reality television series which began March 4, 2008, and airs on Bravo. The series’ upcoming fourteenth season chronicles six women in New York City— Sai De Silva, Ubah Hassan, Erin Dana Lichy, Jenna Lyons, Jessel Taank, and Brynn Whitfield —as they balance their personal and business lives, along with their social circle.

Former cast members featured over the previous thirteen seasons are: Bethenny Frankel (1-3, 7-11), Luann de Lesseps (1-5, 7-13), Alex McCord (1-4), Ramona Singer (1-13), Jill Zarin (1-4), Kelly Killoren Bensimon (2-4), Sonja Morgan (3-13), Cindy Barshop (4), Aviva Drescher (5-6), Carole Radziwill (5-10), Heather Thomson (5-7), Kristen Taekman (6-7), Dorinda Medley (7-12), Jules Wainstein (8), Tinsley Mortimer (9-12), Leah McSweeney (12-13), and Eboni K. Williams (13).

, a total of 256 original episodes of The Real Housewives of New York City have aired.

Series overview

Episodes

Season 1 (2008)

Bethenny Frankel, Luann de Lesseps, Alex McCord, Ramona Singer and Jill Zarin are introduced as series regulars.

Season 2 (2009)

Kelly Killoren Bensimon joined the cast.

Season 3 (2010)

Sonja Morgan joined the cast. Jennifer Gilbert served in a recurring capacity.

Season 4 (2011)

Frankel departed as a series regular. Cindy Barshop joined the cast.

Season 5 (2012)

McCord, Zarin, Killoren Bensimon and Barshop departed as series regulars. Aviva Drescher, Carole Radziwill and Heather Thomson joined the cast.

Season 6 (2014)

de Lesseps departed as a series regular, whilst serving in a recurring capacity. Kristen Taekman joined the cast.

Season 7 (2015)

Drescher departed as a series regular. Frankel and de Lesseps rejoined the cast as series regulars. Dorinda Medley joined the cast.

Season 8 (2016)

Thomson and Taekman departed as series regulars. Jules Wainstein joined the cast.

Season 9 (2017)

Wainstein departed as a series regular. Tinsley Mortimer joined the cast.

Season 10 (2018)

Season 11 (2019)

Radziwill departed as a series regular. Barbara Kavovit served in a recurring capacity.

Season 12 (2020)

Frankel departed as a series regular. Mortimer departed as a series regular after episode 11. Leah McSweeney joined the cast. Elyse Slaine served in a recurring capacity.

Season 13 (2021)

Medley departed as a series regular. Eboni K. Williams joined the cast. Thomson and Bershan Shaw served in recurring capacities.

Season 14 (2023)
de Lesseps, Singer, Morgan, McSweeney and Williams departed as series regulars. Sai De Silva, Ubah Hassan, Erin Dana Lichy, Jenna Lyons, Jessel Taank, and Brynn Whitfield are introduced as new series regulars.

References

External links

Real Housewives of New York City episodes
New York City episodes
New York City-related lists